This is a list of Billboard magazine's Top Hot 100 singles of 1974. The Top 100, as revealed in the Talent In Action section of Billboard dated December 28, 1974, is based on Hot 100 charts from the issue dates of November 24, 1973, through October 26, 1974.

See also
1974 in music
List of Billboard Hot 100 number-one singles of 1974
List of Billboard Hot 100 top-ten singles in 1974

References

1974 record charts
Billboard charts